The cabinet of General Cavaignac was the government of France from 28 June 1848 to 20 December 1848. It replaced the Executive Commission of 1848 after the June Days Uprising of 23 June to 26 June 1848. General Louis-Eugène Cavaignac (1802-1857) was given executive power by the National Assembly and headed the government as President of the Council of Ministers.
The government was replaced by the first cabinet of Odilon Barrot on 20 December 1848 after  Louis Napoleon had been elected as President.

Ministers
The ministers were:

Changes
 On 5 July 1848, Achille Tenaille de Vaulabelle substituted Hippolyte Carnot as Education Minister.
 On 17 July 1848, Pierre Marie de Saint-Georges substituted Eugène Bethmont as Justice Minister; Raymond de Verninac Saint-Maur substituted Jules Bastide as Navy Minister and Bastide substituted Marie Alphonse Bedeau as Foreign Affairs Minister.
 On 13 October 1848, Alexandre Pierre Freslon substituted Achille Tenaille de Vaulabelle as Education Minister; Jules Dufaure substituted Jules Sénard as Interior Minister and Alexandre-François Vivien substituted Adrien Recurt as Public Works Minister.
 On 25 October 1848, Ariste Jacques Trouvé-Chauvel substituted Michel Goudchaux as Finance Minister.

References

Sources

French governments
1848 establishments in France
1848 disestablishments in France
Cabinets established in 1848
Cabinets disestablished in 1848